Yngve Robert Holm (12 September 1895 – 16 February 1943) was a Swedish sailor who competed in the 1920 Summer Olympics. He was a crew member of the Swedish boat Sif, which won the gold medal in the 40m² Skerry cruiser.

References

External links
 
 
 

1895 births
1943 deaths
Swedish male sailors (sport)
Sailors at the 1920 Summer Olympics – 40m2 Skerry cruiser
Olympic sailors of Sweden
Olympic gold medalists for Sweden
Olympic medalists in sailing
Norrköpings Segelsällskap sailors
Medalists at the 1920 Summer Olympics
People from Västervik Municipality
Sportspeople from Kalmar County
20th-century Swedish people